Jawahar Navodaya Vidyalaya Belpada is a residential co-educational learning institution situated in the Belpada village of the Bolangir district of the Indian state of Odisha.
It provides education from Classes 6 to 12. It has two streams, Science and Arts in senior secondary level.
It was established and is managed by Navodaya Vidyalaya Samiti, which is an autonomous organization of the Ministry of Human Resource Development, and Department of Secondary Education and Higher Education.

History 
Jawahar Navodaya Vidyalaya in Balangir district was founded by the Ministry of Human Resources Development at Belpada in 1987. The school was established at its permanent site in 1991.

Affiliation 
JNV Belpada is affiliated to the Central Board of Secondary Education, New Delhi.

References

External links 
 NVS Official Website
 NVS RO Bhopal

Schools in Odisha
Balangir district
Jawahar Navodaya Vidyalayas in Odisha
1987 establishments in Orissa
Educational institutions established in 1987